Pavel Iliych Muslimov (born June 15, 1967 in Ufa) is a former Russian biathlete.

Biathlon results
All results are sourced from the International Biathlon Union.

Olympic Games
1 medal (1 bronze)

World Championships
2 medals (2 silver)

*During Olympic seasons competitions are only held for those events not included in the Olympic program.
**Pursuit was added in 1997.

Individual victories
1 victories (1 In)

*Results are from UIPMB and IBU races which include the Biathlon World Cup, Biathlon World Championships and the Winter Olympic Games.

References
 IBU Profile

1967 births
Living people
Russian male biathletes
Biathletes at the 1998 Winter Olympics
Olympic biathletes of Russia
Olympic bronze medalists for Russia
Olympic medalists in biathlon
Biathlon World Championships medalists
Medalists at the 1998 Winter Olympics
Universiade medalists in biathlon
Universiade gold medalists for Russia
Competitors at the 1993 Winter Universiade
21st-century Russian people
20th-century Russian people